The University of Ghana Medical Centre is a quaternary medical and research centre located on the campus of the University of Ghana in Accra, Ghana.

History 
The establishment of the University of Ghana Medical center was conceived by the faculty and administration of the University of Ghana and initiated under the Late President John Evans Atta-Mills

Emergency
The hospital helped in the fight of the novel Coronavirus.

See also
University of Ghana Medical School

References 

University of Ghana
Hospitals in Ghana